Caleb Strong (1745–1819) was a U.S. Senator from Massachusetts from 1789 to 1796. Senator Strong may refer to:

Bennett Strong, Wisconsin State Senate
Frances Strong (born 1931), Alabama State Senate
Henry W. Strong (1810–1848), New York State Senate
Jack Boynton Strong (1930–2015), Texas State Senate
John Strong (Michigan politician) (1830–1913), Michigan State Senate
Julius L. Strong (1828–1872), Connecticut State Senate
Luther M. Strong (1838–1903), Ohio State Senate
Simeon Strong (1735–1805), Massachusetts State Senate
Theodore Strong (New Jersey politician) (1863–1928), New Jersey State Senate